Rolf Gerling (born 15 December 1954 in Cologne) is a German billionaire ranked #512 worldwide in wealth by Forbes magazine. He has a net worth of approximately US$1.5 billion. He inherited a 94% stake in Gerling Konzern from his father Hans Gerling, valued at US$1.6 billion in 1992. Gerling Konzern is one of the world's largest writers of reinsurance policies. Gerling managed the firm until he sold his stake in 2005 to the Talanx Group and now works mostly with the Gerling Academy for Risk Research, an environmental think tank that he founded. Gerling lives in Switzerland.

External links 
 Forbes profile

Further reading 
  

1954 births
German billionaires
Businesspeople from Cologne
Living people
German expatriates in Switzerland
German financial businesspeople
20th-century German businesspeople
21st-century German businesspeople